The Theatre Alfred Jarry was founded in January 1926 by Antonin Artaud with Robert Aron and Roger Vitrac, in Paris, France. It was influenced by Surrealism and Theatre of the Absurd, and was foundational to Artaud's theory of the Theatre of Cruelty. The theatre was named after Alfred Jarry, who is most known for creating Ubu Roi. Though short-lived, the theatre was attended by an enormous range of European artists, including Arthur Adamov, André Gide, and Paul Valéry.:249

Productions 
{
  "type": "FeatureCollection",
  "features": [
    {
      "type": "Feature",
      "geometry": {
        "type": "Point",
        "coordinates": [
          2.298073,
          48.845412
        ]
      },
      "properties": {
        "name": "The Theatre of Grenelle",
        "marker-color":"2c528c",
        "marker-symbol": "-number-see"
      }
    },
    {
      "type": "Feature",
      "geometry": {
        "type": "Point",
        "coordinates": [
          2.303288,
          48.865813
        ]
      },
      "properties": {
        "name": "The Comedy of Champs-Elysees",
        "marker-color":"2c528c",
        "marker-symbol": "-number-see"
      }
    },
     {
      "type": "Feature",
      "geometry": {
        "type": "Point",
        "coordinates": [
          2.342259,
          48.883413
        ]
      },
      "properties": {
        "name": "The Theatre of the Atelier",
        "marker-color":"2c528c",
        "marker-symbol": "-number-see"
      }
    },
     {
      "type": "Feature",
      "geometry": {
        "type": "Point",
        "coordinates": [
          2.301754,
          48.867894
        ]
      },
      "properties": {
        "name": "The Theatre of the Avenue",
        "marker-color":"2c528c",
        "marker-symbol": "-number-see"
      }
    }
  ]
}
The Theatre Alfred Jarry staged four productions between June 1927 and January 1929. The theatre advertised that they would produce Artaud's play Jet de sang in their 1926–1927 season, but it was never mounted and was not premiered until 40 years later.

Season 1 
Théâtre de Grenelle (1 - 2 June, 1927):33 
Antonin Artaud's Ventre brûlé; ou La Mère folle (Burnt Belly, or the Mad Mother)
Maxime Jacob (Musical Composition)
Edmond Beauchamp (Le Roi)
René Bruyez (Prédestine de l'Opium)
Max Joly (Doux Forniente)
Laurent Zacharie (Mystére d'Hollywood)
Yvonne Vibert (La Reine):254
Robert Aron's Gigogne
René Lefèvre (Gigogne)
Geymond Vital (Le vieux domestique)
Yvonne Vibert (La Nourrice)
Edmond Beuchamp (Le Fils légitime)
Max Joly, Ulric Straram, Laurent Zacharie, René Bruyez (Les Bâtards):254
Roger Vitrac's Les Mystères de l’amour (The Mysteries of Love)

Season 2 
 Comédie des Champs-Élysées (14 January 1928):34 
Vsevolod Pudovkin's Mother (1926)
Act III of Paul Claudel's Le Partage de midi
Génica Athanasiou, Ysé:256

Season 3 
Théâtre de L'Avenue, (2 & 9 June, 1928):33
August Strindberg's A Dream Play
Antonin Artaud (Theology)
Tania Balachova (Indra's Daughter/Agnes)
Auguste Boverio (The Poet)
Étienne Decroux (The Quarantine Master)
Raymond Rouleau (The Officer)
Yvonne Save (Mother/Caretaker)
Edmond Beauchamp
Maxime Fabert
Ghita Luchaire
Ulric Straram
Laurent Zacharie

Season 4 
Comédie des Champs-Élysées (24 & 29 December, 1928, & 5 January 1929):34
Roger Vitrac's Victor; ou, Le pouvoir aux les enfants 
Marc Darnault (the boy)

Notable Members 

 Antonin Artaud - Founder, writer and creative director.
 Robert Aron - Founder, producer for first three seasons.
 Roger Vitrac - Founder and writer.
 Yvonne Allendy - Treasurer. Madame Allendy also took up the role of the creation of promotional materials, such as posters and invitations.
 René Allendy - Investor. Monsieur Allendy was a friend of Artaud, and took interest in his work. Allendy and his wife raised 3,000 francs as an initial investment for its first season.

Actors 
The following actors performed at TAJ::43

 Genica Athanasiou 
 Tania Balachova 
 Edmond Beauchamp
 Andre Berley
 Jeanne Bernard 
 Domenica Blazy 
 Auguste Boverio
 René Bruyez
 Henri Cremieux
 Max Dalban 
 Dalle
 Marc Darnault
 Etienne Decroux 
 Maxime Fabert
 Edith Farnese Gilles 
 Jacqueline Hopstein 
 Max Joly
 Elizabeth Lannay 
 René Lefèvre
 Robert Le Flon
 Ghita Luchaire
 Jean Mamy
 Germaine Ozier 
 Alexandra Pecker
 Raymond Rouleau 
 Sarantidis
 Yvonne Save 
 Ulric Straram 
 Yvonne Vibert
 Geymond Vital
 De Vos 
 Laurent Zacharie

References 

Theatre companies in France